McConnell government may refer to:
First McConnell government, the Scottish Executive led by Jack McConnell from 2001 to 2003
Second McConnell government, the Scottish Executive led by Jack McConnell from 2003 to 2007